Antonius Jan Glazemaker (19 April 1931 – 20 January 2018) served as the twenty-first Old Catholic Archbishop of Utrecht, from 1982 to 2000.

Born on April 19, 1931 to Old Catholic parents, Glazemaker was raised in the Netherlands during a period ecumenical initiatives and the creation of the World Council of Churches.

On July 1, 1956, Glazemaker was ordained to the priesthood in Hilversum by Archbishop of Utrecht Andreas Rinkel. In 1979, he was appointed the 13th bishop of Deventer, an office that he assumed on December 8, 1979 in IJmuiden, where he served as pastor. 

On February 6, 1982, Glazemaker was elected Archbishop of Utrecht, succeeding Marinus Kok, who had retired.

Under his leadership, the Old Catholic Church allowed for remarriage after divorce and ordained its first woman priest in 1999. 

Glazemaker retired as Archbishop of Utrecht on February 12, 2000.

References

1931 births
2018 deaths
20th-century archbishops
Dutch Old Catholic bishops
People from Hilversum